VV Gestel is a football club from Eindhoven, Netherlands. VV Gestel plays in the 2017–18 Sunday Eerste Klasse.

External links
 Official site

Football clubs in the Netherlands
Football clubs in Eindhoven
Association football clubs established in 2005
2005 establishments in the Netherlands